Team FOG Næstved is a professional basketball team from Næstved, Denmark, playing in the best Danish basketball league, Basketligaen.
The team won its first title in 2017, where they won the Danish Basketball Cup. Their current head coach is Andy Hipsher. 
The team is named after the former supermarket chain FOG.

In the 2015–16 Basketligaen season, the club had the highest average attendances in the league's regular season, as the club finishing third. In the 2016–17 season, FOG once again had the highest average attendance in the league's regular season with an average of 1,168 attendants per game.

Notable players

Honours
Basketligaen
Third place (4): 2010–11, 2014–15, 2015–16, 2018–19
Danish Men's Basketball Cup
Winners (1): 2016-17

Season by season

External links
 Eurobasket.com FOG Naestved Page

Basketball teams in Denmark
Næstved Municipality
1962 establishments in Denmark
Basketball teams established in 1962